The Reopening Ontario Act is an Act of the Legislative Assembly of Ontario that grants the Lieutenant Governor in Council the ability to continue "orders made under sections 7.0.2 and 7.1 of the Emergency Management and Civil Protection Act in relation to (the) COVID-19 (pandemic)".

History

On the day the Bill came for third reading in the Legislature, Belinda Karahalios was removed from the Progressive Conservative caucus by Premier Doug Ford because she voted against it.

The Ontario Nurses Association characterized the day as dark, and ONA President Vicki McKenna said that it "provides extensive powers to override collective agreements and take away the rights of our nurses and health-care professionals who have been working so hard to provide care during the pandemic... this bill enables... employers to deny or cancel vacation time, redeploy them to another unit or... facility at any time, and have far too much authority that is unchecked by the collective agreement."

References

2020 establishments in Ontario
Ontario provincial legislation
Emergency management in Canada
Ontario
Coronavirus